Jorge Esteban Balliengo (born 5 January 1978 in Rosario, Santa Fe) is an Argentine discus thrower.

He became South American champion in 2005. He also competed at the 2005 World Championships without qualifying for the final round.

Balliengo's personal best throw is 66.32 metres, achieved in April 2006 in Rosario. This is the current Argentine and South American record.

Achievements

References

1978 births
Living people
Argentine male discus throwers
Athletes (track and field) at the 2003 Pan American Games
Athletes (track and field) at the 2008 Summer Olympics
Athletes (track and field) at the 2011 Pan American Games
Pan American Games competitors for Argentina
Olympic athletes of Argentina
Sportspeople from Rosario, Santa Fe